The fifth and final season of Jane the Virgin debuted in the United States on The CW on March 27, 2019. The season was produced by CBS Television Studios, with Jennie Snyder Urman serving as showrunner. Jane the Virgin was renewed for a fifth and final season on April 2, 2018.

Season five stars Gina Rodriguez as Jane Villanueva, Andrea Navedo as Jane's mother Xiomara De La Vega, Ivonne Coll as Jane's grandmother Alba Villanueva, and Jaime Camil as Jane's father Rogelio De La Vega, with Justin Baldoni as Jane's lover and baby daddy Rafael Solano, Brett Dier as Jane's supposedly dead husband,  Michael Cordero and Yael Grobglas as Rafael's ex-wife and other baby mama Petra Solano and Elias Janssen as Jane's son Mateo Solano Villanueva.

Cast and characters

Main 

 Gina Rodriguez as Jane Villanueva
 Andrea Navedo as Xiomara De La Vega
 Yael Grobglas as Petra Solano
 Justin Baldoni as Rafael Solano
 Ivonne Coll as Alba Villanueva
 Elias Janssen as Mateo Solano Villanueva
 Brett Dier as Michael Cordero/Jason
 Jaime Camil as Rogelio De La Vega

Recurring 
 Brooke Shields as River Fields
 Rosario Dawson as Jane Ramos
 Yara Martinez as Luisa Alver
 Bridget Regan as Rose Solano
 Mia and Ella Allan as Anna and Ellie Solano
 Alfonso DiLuca as Jorge Garcia
 Christopher Allen as Dennis Chambers
Tommy Dorfman as Bobby
Shelly Bhalla as Krishna Dhawan
 Priscilla Barnes as Magda Andel
 Justina Machado as Darci Factor
 Keller Wortham as Esteban Santiago

Guest 
Max Bird-Ridnell as Milos Dvoracek
Molly Hagan as Patricia Cordero
 Melanie Mayron as Marlene Donaldson
 Haley Lu Richardson as Charlie
 Eden Sher as PJ Fields
Sophia Bush as Julie Larson
Diane Guerrero as Lina Santillan
Ludo Lefebvre as himself
Rita Moreno as Liliana De La Vega

Episodes

Reception

Ratings

Notes

References

2019 American television seasons